Winter Kills is the sixth studio album by American heavy metal band DevilDriver. It was released on August 27, 2013, via Napalm Records. It is the only DevilDriver album to feature new bassist Chris Towning who was a touring member from 2012 until joining permanently in February 2013. Recording of instrumental parts took place at Audiohammer Studios in Sanford, Florida and the album was produced by Mark Lewis. The album is available in several different configurations which can include bonus tracks or a live DVD. It would be DevilDriver's last album with founding members John Boecklin and Jeff Kendrick before both of them left the band in October 2014.

"Sail" is a cover of a song by indie band Awolnation. Frontman Dez Fafara was turned on to the original by his then-teenage sons.

Reception

Winter Kills received a Metacritic score of 70 based on six reviews, indicating generally favorable reviews.

The album sold around 11,000 copies in the United States in its first week of release to debut at position No. 32 on Billboard 200 chart. It has sold 50,000 copies in the United States as of April 2016.

Track listing

Charts

Personnel
DevilDriver
 Dez Fafara – vocals
 Mike Spreitzer – lead guitar
 Jeff Kendrick – rhythm guitar
 Chris Towning – bass
 John Boecklin – drums

Technical personnel
Mark Lewis – production
Dean Karr – cover art photography
Ryan Clark – cover art layout

References

2013 albums
Napalm Records albums
DevilDriver albums
Albums produced by Mark Lewis (music producer)